Microsoft Technology Associate was an entry-level certification that validates fundamental technology skills and knowledge in Microsoft products. MTA exams were designed to assess and validate core technical concepts in three primary areas: Databases (MS SQL Server), Development (Visual Studio) and IT Infrastructure (Windows, Windows Server). MTA exams and certification were offered as part of the Microsoft Certified Professional (MCP) program.

All exams were retired on June 30, 2022.

Retired exam list 
As of October 7, 2019, the retired Microsoft Technology Associate exams are:

Exam availability 
The Microsoft Technology Associate exams can be scheduled with two exam providers:
 Certiport for students, educators and schools
 Pearson VUE
There are multiple differences about scheduling an exam with Certiport or Pearson VUE such as:
 In Pearson VUE, you need to have two identification documents while in Certiport, you need to have only one
 In Pearson VUE, they take a photo of you and they want a digital signature while in Certiport you don't have to do it
 Outside the United States, there is a restriction with voucher availability in some countries. For example, the Greek Authorized Partner of Certiport can give vouchers only to testing centers and not to candidates while in Pearson VUE you can purchase the voucher online via VUE's site.
 In Pearson VUE testing centers, there are testing days and hours very often while in Certiport, there is one exam datetime per 15 days.

References

Microsoft certification